Borci is a village in the municipalities of Jezero, Republika Srpska and Jajce, Bosnia and Herzegovina.

Demographics 
According to the 2013 census, its population was 19, all Serbs living in the Jezero part with no one living in the Jajce part.

References

Populated places in Jezero, Bosnia and Herzegovina
Populated places in Jajce
Villages in Republika Srpska